We Cool? is the debut solo studio album by Jeff Rosenstock. It was released by SideOneDummy Records on March 3, 2015.

The album crashed the SideOneDummy website upon its release.  It debuted on the Billboard charts at #7 for Heatseekers Albums, #43 for Rock Albums, and #157 for Current Albums.  It features guest appearances by Laura Stevenson, P.O.S, and  members of Shinobu. Jeff Rosenstock toured the album with AJJ, Chumped, and The Smith Street Band.

Track listing

External links
We Cool? on Quote Unquote Records

References

2015 albums
Jeff Rosenstock albums
SideOneDummy Records albums
Albums produced by Jack Shirley